Hiba Omar (born 22 June 1990) is a Syrian athlete who competes in the discus and the shot put.

Career
Omar was born in Quneitra which is near both Israel and Palestine in the Golan Heights. She was inspired by Ghada Shouaa who won a medal in Atlanta at the Olympics in 1996.

She is one of five athletes who train in Damascus which includes high jumper Majd Eddin Ghazal. At the Asian Athletics competition in 2017 she was sole athlete from her worn-torn country. She carried the flag and photos of this drew media attention. She gave guarded interviews to foreign journalists after her manager was assured that the purpose of the interviews was not political. Hiba refused to answer questions about politics and assured the press that she had every facility for training in Syria.

She threw 13.69 metre in the shot put in Thailand in 2012 and she made a discus throw of 50.44 in Cairo in 2018.

Personal bests
Outdoor
Shot put – 13.69 (2012)
Discus throw – 50.44 (2018)
Indoor 
Shot put – 11.86 (2010)

Competition record

References

1990 births
Living people
People from Quneitra
Athletes (track and field) at the 2014 Asian Games
Syrian female athletes
Asian Games competitors for Syria